Jake Wesley Rogers is an American pop musician and songwriter.

Early life
Rogers grew up in Ozark, Missouri, where he learned to play the guitar at age 6 and began playing piano and voice training at age 12. Rogers began performing in theater productions in 5th grade and writing songs soon thereafter. At a young age he attended formative concerts for artists like Lady Gaga and Nelly Furtado. Rogers came out as gay in 6th grade, and though his family was supportive he felt he had to hide his orientation due to the cultural climate in his hometown.

Rogers moved to Nashville at age 18 to study songwriting at Belmont University. In his first year Rogers' live performance attracted the interest of Sony/ATV, resulting in a publishing deal. Rogers graduated in 2018.

Career

2016–2020: Early career
Rogers began releasing music independently in 2016, leading to his debut EP Evergreen in June 2017. After releasing his next two singles "Jacob from the Bible" and "Little Queen" in February and March 2019 respectively, Rogers released his sophomore EP Spiritual in April 2019, followed by a European tour and a performance on BBC Radio 4 that fall.

In November 2020, Rogers was featured on the Happiest Season soundtrack executive produced by Justin Tranter, alongside a slate of other LGBTQ songwriters and artists.

2021–present: Warner Records signing
In May 2021, it was revealed that Rogers had signed to Warner Records via Tranter's imprint Facet Records. Rogers' manager Lucas Canzona got Tranter's attention in 2019 with an email highlighting a live performance of Rogers' single "Jacob from the Bible". Tranter brought Rogers to the attention of Warner Records CEO and co-chairman Aaron Bay-Schuck, who was "captivated" by Rogers' live performance, and the two signed Rogers in late 2020. Rogers released his debut major label single "Middle of Love" alongside the announcement. The single, which was co-written with Tranter and Eren Cannata, is the first offering from Rogers' forthcoming 2021 EP. Rogers released his next single "Momentary" in June 2020.
Rogers made his TV debut on October 5, 2021 on The Late Late Show with James Corden (Season 7, Episode 17), performing the song “Middle of Love”. Rogers appeared as an opening act on Ben Platt's Reverie Tour in September and October 2022. Rogers also appeared as an opening act on Panic! At the Disco's Viva Las Vengeance Tour in September and October 2022.

Discography

EPs

Singles

References

External links 
 Official website

Living people
America's Got Talent contestants
American male singer-songwriters
American gay musicians
21st-century American singers
21st-century American male singers
Year of birth missing (living people)
Belmont University alumni
Warner Records artists
Singer-songwriters from Missouri
American LGBT singers
LGBT people from Missouri